is a Japanese footballer who plays as a forward for Criacao Shinjuku in Japan Football League.

Club statistics

References

External links

j-league

1986 births
Living people
Juntendo University alumni
Association football people from Shizuoka Prefecture
Japanese footballers
J1 League players
J2 League players
J3 League players
Júbilo Iwata players
Mito HollyHock players
Gainare Tottori players
Association football forwards